Allobarbital, also known as allobarbitone and branded as Dial, Cibalgine (in combination with aminophenazone), or Dial-Ciba (in combination with ethyl carbamate), is a barbiturate derivative invented in 1912 by Ernst Preiswerk and Ernst Grether working for CIBA. It was used primarily as an anticonvulsant although it has now largely been replaced by newer drugs with improved safety profiles. Other uses for allobarbital included as an adjutant to boost the activity of analgesic drugs, and use in the treatment of insomnia and anxiety. 

Allobarbital was never particularly widely used compared to better known barbiturates such as phenobarbital and secobarbital, although it saw more use in some European countries such as Bulgaria and Slovakia, and is still used in for example Poland, but only as compound.

References 

Barbiturates
GABAA receptor positive allosteric modulators
Allyl compounds